Frank Mayo Brickey (July 5, 1912 – September 27, 1994) was an American football and basketball coach.  He served as the head football coach at Arizona State Teachers College at Flagstaff—now known as Northern Arizona University—from 1943 to 1946.  Brickey was the head basketball coach at the school from 1940 to 1947.

Playing career
Brickey played high school football at Grossmont High in San Diego, California and was a member of the 1927 team that won the Class B Southern California State Football Championship. In college, he played for Arizona State Teachers College in Flagstaff, Arizona, lettering for three years and being chosen all conference. Brickey was also selected to play on the Arizona All-Star Team which played an exhibition match against the 1934 NFL Championship Chicago Bears. The Arizona team lost that match, 46–6.

Coaching career
Brickey was the boys' basketball coach at Duncan High School in Duncan, Arizona and notably lead that school to three consecutive state championships in 1938, 1939, and 1940. After his stint as a high school coach and educator, Brickey returned to Arizona State Teachers College where he was the head coach of both the men's football and basketball teams from 1943 to 1946. Brickey then moved to Salt Lake City and served as an assistant coach at The University of Utah from 1947 to 1956.

1940 Arizona State boys' high school basketball championship
In the era before state high school divisions were defined by student enrollment, Duncan High School won three consecutive state titles in men's basketball, a feat never repeated in the state of Arizona. The 1940 title is significant due to the two teams that contended for it. Student enrollment at Tucson High School that year was around 3,500. The population of the entire town of Duncan, Arizona was 887. The Duncan team won, 31–29. Among the players on that team were Gene O'Dell, Joe Francese, Jack Lunt, Preston Aker, and Fred Arnet.

Head coaching record

College football

References

External links
 

1912 births
1994 deaths
Basketball coaches from California
Northern Arizona Lumberjacks football coaches
Northern Arizona Lumberjacks football players
Northern Arizona Lumberjacks men's basketball coaches
High school basketball coaches in Arizona
People from Ironton, Ohio
Players of American  football from San Diego